Ramathallus is a genus of sessile lobate alga that represents a probable stem-Rhodophyte from the Proterozoic. The holotype of Ramathallus lobatus shows a cell structure with finger-like protrusions and a coating of non-cellular apatic. The cells have a dark granular material inside of them. The organism grew by apical growth and possessed pseudoparenchymatous thallus which in turn infer a possible affinity with the Florideophyceae. Many lobate protrusions radiated from the organisms centre composed out of pseudoparenchymatous tissue interpreted as "Cell fountains" made up of variably-sized cells. Ramathallus shares a close morphological similarity with the Ediacaran genera made up of pseudoparenchymatous, lobate fossils from the Doushantuo phosphorites of China Thallophyca, Thallophycoides, Paramecia and Gremiphyca.

See also 
Proterozoic
Red algae

References 

Florideophyceae
Red algae
Proterozoic Asia
Prehistoric eukaryote genera